was one of the administrative divisions of Taiwan during the Japanese ruling period from 1895 until 1945. The prefecture consisted of modern-day Penghu County.

Population

Administrative divisions

Subprefectures
In 1945 (Shōwa 20), there were 2 subprefectures.

Towns and Villages
The districts are divided into towns (街) and villages (庄)

See also
Political divisions of Taiwan (1895-1945)
Governor-General of Taiwan
Taiwan under Japanese rule
Administrative divisions of the Republic of China

Former prefectures of Japan in Taiwan